Myles Hogarth (born 30 March 1975 in Falkirk) is a Scottish professional footballer, who played as a goalkeeper for several Scottish league clubs. Myles has a son called Jay Hogarth at Rangers B’ and Myles is currently the goalie coach at Berwick Rangers.

Career

Hogarth started his career with Hearts making only one appearance for the club in the Scottish Cup before he went on a three-month loan to Airdrieonians. Hogarth made his professional league debut on 13 September 1997 against Greenock Morton. After his loan expired with Airdrieonians Hogarth went on loan to Hamilton Academical for the remainder of the 1997/98 season making his debut for Hamilton on 20 December 1997 against Raith Rovers. After returning to Hearts at the end of the 1997/98 season Hogarth was released and signed with Falkirk. Hogart made his debut for Falkirk on 10 April 1999 against his former club Airdrieonians. Hogarth made over 100 appearances for Falkirk before he moved to Alloa Athletic in 2003. Hogarth made his debut against Inverness Caledonian Thistle on 3 August 2002. Hogarth only featured in eight games for Alloa Athletic before he was released by the club to enable him to join local rivals Stirling Albion who were in the grip of a goalkeeper crisis with their experienced goalkeeper Chris Reid being injured this only left Stirling Albion with 19-year-old goalkeeper Anton Nugent before Hogarth joined the club. Hogarth made his debut for Stirling Albion on 11 March 2003 against Greenock Morton. Hogarth made over 150 appearances for Stirling Albion he then lost his place to keeper Scott Christie taking the number one Jersey.

References

External links
Stirling Albion's unofficial website
Redweb Stirling Albion's unofficial website for match reports and photos
Profile at londonhearts.com

Stirling Albion F.C. players
Living people
Footballers from Falkirk
1975 births
Hamilton Academical F.C. players
Scottish footballers
Association football goalkeepers
Heart of Midlothian F.C. players
Airdrieonians F.C. (1878) players
Falkirk F.C. players
Alloa Athletic F.C. players
Scottish Football League players
Camelon Juniors F.C. players